Washerwoman or Washerwomem may refer to: 

 Washerwoman, a laundress, i.e. a woman who takes in laundry. Both terms are now old-fashioned.
 Alternanthera caracasana, a plant
 The Irish Washerwoman, a traditional dance
 The Washerwomen (Les Blanchisseuses), early film (1896) by Georges Méliès
 The Washer Woman, an outdoor sculpture in Mexico
 Washerwoman's sprain, a colloquial name for De Quervain syndrome, an injury of the thumb typically caused by repetitive action

See also

 The Laundress (disambiguation)
 Launderette (disambiguation)
 
 
 
 
 
 
 Women (disambiguation)
 Woman (disambiguation)
 Washer (disambiguation)